The Laberge River is a tributary of Lake Hebert, flowing in Canada, in:
Rattray Township of Timiskaming District, in Northeastern Ontario;
Rollet and Montbeillard sectors in the Northwest of Regional County Municipality (RCM) of Rouyn-Noranda, Abitibi-Témiscamingue, in Quebec.

Forestry is the main economic activity of this hydrographic slope; recreational and tourism activities, in second.

Annually, the surface of the river is generally frozen from mid-November to late April, however, the period of safe ice circulation is usually from mid-December to early April.

Courses 
The river begins at the mouth of Icefield Lake (length:  altitude) in Rattray Township, District of Timiskaming, in Ontario.

 south, then east, in Rattray Township, Timiskaming District, Ontario, to the border of Quebec;
 in the Rollet sector, the Regional County Municipality (MRC) of Rouyn-Noranda, Abitibi-Témiscamingue, Quebec;
 to the North, crossing Lake Laberge ();
 North to the southern boundary of the Montbillard area of the regional county municipality (RCM) of Rouyn-Noranda;
 North in the Montbeillard sector to its mouth.

The mouth of the Laberge River empties onto the South shore of Lake Hébert. This confluence is located at:
 Southwest of the Quebec - Ontario border;
 South of the mouth of the Lac Hébert outlet (confluence with Lake Buies);
 Northeast of the mouth of Raven Lake (Ontario);
 Northwest of the mouth Larder River (Ontario).

Toponymy
The term "Laberge" is a family name of French origin.

The toponym "Laberge River" was formalized on December 5, 1968, by the Commission de toponymie du Québec, when the commission was created.

Notes and references

See also 

Lac Hebert, a body of water
Lake Raven, a body of water
Laberge River Provincial Park
Larder River (Ontario), a watercourse
Blanche River (Lake Timiskaming), a training course
Lake Timiskaming, a water body
Ottawa River, a watercourse
List of rivers of Quebec

Rivers of Abitibi-Témiscamingue
Rouyn-Noranda
Rivers of Timiskaming District